Lelia Josephine Robinson (July 23, 1850 – August 10, 1891) was the first woman to be admitted to the bar and practice in the courts of Massachusetts in 1882.

Early life
Lelia J. Robinson was born on July 23, 1850 to a white, middle-class family in Boston, Massachusetts. Her parents were Mary and Daniel Robinson.

Robinson married Rupert J. Chute at seventeen years old, after completing her public education. She worked as a journalist in Boston, writing for the Boston Globe, the Boston Post, and the Boston Times. She also worked in Berlin as a foreign correspondent. After Robinson divorced her husband in 1877 for adultery, the only acceptable grounds for divorce at that time, she decided to pursue a legal career in effort to support herself at the age of twenty-eight.

Education
Robinson enrolled as a student at Boston University School of Law in October 1879, the only woman in a class of 150. Other women had enrolled as law students at Boston University before Robinson, but all of them failed to complete their legal education. She was the first woman to graduate from Boston University School of Law, in June 1881. She graduated, cum laude, as number four in her class out of 32 students.

Admittance to the bar
After graduating from law school, Robinson was denied admission to the Massachusetts Bar in Suffolk County in June 1881 by Chief Justice Horace Gray. Robinson took up the matter with the Supreme Court of Massachusetts which allowed her to draft a brief in support of her argument in favor of women practicing law. The Massachusetts Supreme Court then determined prior that women could not be lawyers, despite no language in the Massachusetts constitution to the contrary. The court reasoned that, while attorneys were public officers, they were close enough to make the court pause. The only offices women were traditionally allowed to hold at common law were overseer of the poor and queen, so the court decided to defer to the Massachusetts legislature on the issue of allowing women to practice law. While waiting for her admittance to the bar, Robinson had her own legal business with male lawyers to conduct her cases in the court. She was not even permitted to present her oral argument for bar admittance on her own behalf.

There was a general fear in the late nineteenth century that allowing a woman to practice law would lead to their right to suffrage (a right that was not granted until 1920), and a disturbance of the current social order. The court eventually unanimously denied her petition, claiming that existing law set no precedent for allowing women to practice in the courts, and that the legislature's failure to expressly provide that women could become members of the bar was further support of that opinion.

Unfazed, Robinson took her fight to the legislature. She drafted a bill that would authorize women to take the bar exam and practice law in the court and garnered support. Robinson argued that the word "citizen" in the Massachusetts Bar statute was a gender neutral term and that Massachusetts should follow the direction of fourteen other states that had admitted women to the bar. She argued that "as a citizen, under the Fourteenth Amendment to the Constitution, her privileges and immunities could not be abridged, and thus she was entitled to take the bar examination just like her male colleagues". The Massachusetts legislature responded to the Supreme Court of Massachusetts ruling and passed the bill just one year after its ruling, announcing: "The best administration of justice may be most safely secured by allowing the representation of all classes of the people in courts of justice." The legislature also allowed women to be appointed as "special commissioners," which was a way to allow women to perform notary duties without running afoul of Massachusetts's constitutional ban at the time.

Following the passage of the bill, Robinson took and passed the bar exam in 1882 and became the first woman to be admitted to the bar and practice in the courts of Massachusetts. Robinson also helped to draft and pass a Massachusetts bill allowing women to take depositions and administer oaths.

Legal career
Robinson went on to have her own private legal practice, and moved to Seattle, Washington, in 1884 where society was much more receptive to women in the law. The judge for the Washington Territory, Roger Sherman Greene, appointed her as a criminal defense attorney. Robinson was the first woman in Washington to argue a case to a jury and to argue in front of a jury consisting of both men and women. She wrote a few major publications, including a book on divorce law titled The Law of Husband and Wife.

She took various surveys about women in the law, compiling information on their professional and personal lives, and constantly pushing for gender equality in the profession. She located 120 female lawyers and published an article about them in the Green Bag.

Lelia J. Robinson died at the age of 41, in 1891, leaving behind a remarkable impact on our legal history. In a paper published shortly before her death, she imparted these final words to future generations: "[I]n time, sooner or later, the lawyer everywhere who deserves success and can both work and wait to win it, is sure to achieve it, -the woman no less than the man."

The Lelia J. Robinson Award
Each year, The Women's Bar Association of Massachusetts (WBA) presents the Lelia J. Robinson Award at their annual Gala to a woman who has captured the spirit of pioneering in the legal profession and has made a difference in her community. The attorneys who are given this award have excelled in practice, government, or academia. They have served as mentors and role models and have promoted equality and justice. Recent women in Massachusetts who have received this award are: the late Honorable Judge Nonnie Burnes, Christine Hughes, and Caryn R. Mitchell-Munevar. The award is to remind ourselves of the mission that Lelia J. Robinson sought over a century ago, to extend representation to all classes of people and to build a society that is truly just.

References

External links
Series IX of the Mary Earhart Dillon Collection, 1887-1892. Schlesinger Library, Radcliffe Institute, Harvard University.

Boston University School of Law alumni
Massachusetts lawyers
1850 births
1891 deaths
19th-century American lawyers
19th-century American women lawyers
People of the Washington Territory
The Boston Post people